Fidèle Dirokpa Balufuga was a former Democratic Republic of the Congo Anglican bishop. He was the Anglican Archbishop of the Province of the Anglican Church of the Congo. He was also Bishop of Kinshasa.

Dirokpa was elected Bishop of Bukavu when his diocese was still a part of the Anglican Province of Rwanda, Burundi and Zaire, in 1982, and would be in office until 2003. During his tenure it was created the new Province of the Anglican Church of Zaire, in 1992, renamed Province of the Anglican Church of the Congo, in 1997, upon the changing of the name of the country. He also would be Dean of the Province. He was elected second Primate and Archbishop of the Congo, with his enthronement taking place on 16 February 2003.

Dirokpa was a member of the Global South (Anglican) Primates. He supported the traditional Anglican stance on homosexuality and criticized the departures taken on the issue by the Episcopal Church and the Anglican Church of Canada. However, Dirokpa chose not to declare his province in impaired communion with them, unlike other African Anglican provinces, saying he preferred dialogue between both parts in conflict.

He was succeeded by Henri Isingoma, elected on 28 April 2009, and enthroned in August 2009.

References

External links
Congo Elects New Primate, Anglican Planet, 3 July 2009

Living people
Democratic Republic of the Congo Anglicans
20th-century Anglican bishops in Africa
21st-century Anglican bishops in Africa
21st-century Anglican archbishops
Year of birth missing (living people)
Anglican archbishops of the Congo
Anglican bishops of Bukavu
Anglican bishops of Kinshasa